Robert Kincaid (June 10, 1832 – August 15, 1920) was an Ontario doctor and political figure. He represented Peterborough West in the Legislative Assembly of Ontario from 1882 to 1883 as a Conservative member.

Biography 
He was born in County Donegal, Ireland on June 10, 1832; his parents were of Scottish descent. Kincaid was educated at Queen's University in Kingston, receiving an M.D. In 1865, he married Maggie M. Bell. He served as surgeon for the Peterborough County jail, for the town of Peterborough and for the local militia. He was elected by acclamation to the provincial assembly in an 1882 by-election held after the death of William Hepburn Scott.

He died at his son's home in Seattle on August 15, 1920.

References 

The Canadian parliamentary companion, 1883 JA Gemmill

1832 births
1920 deaths
Canadian people of Ulster-Scottish descent
Irish emigrants to pre-Confederation Ontario
Progressive Conservative Party of Ontario MPPs